Maria Bossenberger, also Marie Bossenberger, (30 June 1872 – 10 February 1919) was a German operatic  soprano and voice teacher.

Life 
Born in Graz, Bossenberger, daughter of the composer Heinrich Bossenberger and his wife , opera singer, was trained by her father.

At the age of 17, she made her debut on 12 September 1889 as Ännchen in der Freischütz at the Dresden Court Theatre. There, she received a 5-year contract, which was extended for the same period after expiry. The Dresden court opera singer had her main success at a song recital of the Liszt Society in Leipzig on 29 March 1898 when she performed the Loreley by Franz Liszt, the Ständchen by Richard Strauss and the Spielmannslied by Georg Pittrich with piano accompaniment by the composer.

In 1899, she went to the Schauspiel Frankfurt for three years.

She subsequently worked as a singing teacher in Hanover.

Bossenberger died in Hanover aged 46.

Further reading 
 Ludwig Eisenberg: Großes biographisches Lexikon der Deutschen Bühne im XIX. Jahrhundert. Paul List publishing house, Leipzig 1903,.

References

External links 
 

German operatic sopranos
Voice teachers
1872 births
1919 deaths
Musicians from Graz